Aarón Antony Valencia Valenzuela (born 1 June 2003) is a Peruvian footballer who plays as a forward for Sport Boys.

Career statistics

Club

Notes

References

2003 births
Living people
Footballers from Lima
Peruvian footballers
Association football forwards
Sporting Cristal footballers
Sport Boys footballers
Peruvian Primera División players